The Bird That Drinks Tears (abbreviated as ) is a series of South Korean fantasy web novels by Lee Yeongdo. A rare example of the genre Korean Fantasy, the stock characters and clichés of normal western fantasy such as elves, magic, dragons and Latin languages are instead replaced by Korean concepts such as dokkaebi, ssirum, and the Arazi language, which is based on Proto-Korean.

Publishing 
The novel was first serialized in Hitel, a PC communication forum site, continuing the tradition that all novels by Lee Yeongdo are first serialized in the internet. After the conclusion of the series, the book was published by Golden Bough, a publishing company of South Korea. Due to its length, the story was published in four hardcover volumes.

Book 1: Nhagas Who Extract Their Hearts 
Book 2: Rekkons Who Pursue Their Desire
Book 3: Tokebis Who Play Their Fire
Book 4: Humans Who Seek Their King

This work has been sold to a European publisher at about 300 million won (US$235,997) in advance royalty payment for the right to publish it.

Plot
The world is largely divided into northern and southern Kiboren. 1500 years ago, the Nhagas started a 'Great Expansion War' against other races to expand their territories. Conflict between the north people who needed farmland to eat grain and the nhaga who needed forests to hunt was inevitable. The kingdom of Arazi, founded by the legendary Rekkon 'the Hero King', was destroyed after hundreds of years of war against the nhaga. Because they are cold-blooded animals, the Nhaga, who could not live in the northern temperature, planted trees and created forests where they could live, and this forest that covered half the world was named Kiboren. Afterwards, Humans, Rekkons, and Tokebis, excluding Nhagas, lived in the North, where Nhagas could not come up, and Nhagas also lived in Kiboren, which became a maze that Northerners could not enter, and spent hundreds of years disconnected from each other.

700 years later, the severance between northerners and Nhaga became familiar. A message was sent from the 'Hainsha Temple' to the Tokebi 'Henby Surabol', the Rekkon 'Tynahan', and the unknown Human 'Kagan Draca'. According to the old adage, 'Three Handles One', they asked to form a rescue party of three races and enter Kiboren to rescue one Nhaga.

On the other hand, 'Ryn Paye', a boy who lived in 'Hattengraj', the center of Nhaga society, becomes an adult and participates in Heart Extraction Ceremony. It is a ritual that makes Nhaga immortal by extracting his heart and storing it in the Heart Tower, but Ryn, who has memories of his father's death, fears the upcoming extraction. Ryn runs away from the ceremony and witnesses the murder of his friend ‘Harit Makerowe’. He fulfills Harit’s last request and heads north to meet the rescue party.

Main characters

Rescue Party
 Kagan Draka
 A mysterious human who hunts and eats nhagas. He is chosen as the pathfinder of the Rescue Party that must rescue a nhaga and bring the nhaga to Hainsha Temple. His name consists of two animals that were made extinct by the nhaga; in Keytazay hunter's language, his first name 'Kagan,' means black lion, and his last name 'Draka', means Dragon.

 Henby Surabol
 A cheerful tokebi, butler to the lord of Chumunuri (즈믄누리). He can fly around riding the beetle 'Nani' (나늬). He is chosen as the sorcerer of the Rescue Party.

 Tynahan
 An arrogant rekkon who dreams of climbing on the back of a Sky Fish. He is chosen as the defeater of the Rescue Party.

Nhaga
 Ryn Paye
 A young nhaga who is haunted by the murder of his father, which he witnessed when he was eleven years old. He is sent on a mission to leave Kiboren and reach Hainsha Temple, where he must try to save all four races. Because of the death of his father, he fears extracting his heart and ran away from the heart extraction ritual. He later discovers Dragon root, names it 'Ashe-Harital' (아스화리탈), and raises it as a dragon. His name derives from hanja ryun (輪), which means 'wheel'.

 Amo Paye
 A female nhaga renowned for her dancing and swordsmanship. She is also kind to nhaga males, which is uncommon behavior in nhaga society. As a result, the Paye family is popular among males, and Samo becomes an object of jealousy among other families. She is the elder sister of Ryn Paye. When Ryn is accused of murder, she sets out to assassinate her brother, according to nhaga tradition. She later becomes the King of the northern army and fights against the Nhaga's invasion.

 Harit Makerowe
 A Novitiate and a close friend of Ryn Paye. He was originally on a mission to contact the rescue party in the north.

 Viass Makerowe
 As a person who has the desire to become the head of the Makerowe family, she does not hesitate to commit any extreme actions to achieve his ambition. She is also a well-regarded medicine woman in nhaga society.

 Karindol Makerowe
 Harit's older sister, and wary of Viass's ambitions.

 Galotek
 Guardian. Although a man despised by Nhaga society, he plots to overturn the world with his own ambitions. He bears the spirit of Sarmak, the 'master of death'.

 Serisma
 Guardian. He belongs to the highest rank among the guardians of Hattengraj.

People of the North
 Gualhide Curiha
 Margrave of Curiha. Like many people in the North, he desperately want the return of the king who has been missing for 800 years.

 Rasu Curiha
 Gualhide's cousin. He is a well-known writer, has a sharp tongue and a brilliant brain.

 Kithata Zaboro
 General of Zaboro. He is strongly loyal to his clan.

 Orinol
 Grand Benevolence of Hainsha Temple.

 Jutagi
 Grand Zen master of Hainsha Temple

 Kei
 Boni's son and the aide of Sigouriat Toll Road Rangers.

 Boni
 Kei's mother and the head of Sigouriat Toll Road Rangers.

 Deoni Dalbi
 Lieutenant of the Northern Army. She always has a habit of running, and her running has a characteristic that attracts people. She also have a way of thinking that is difficult for normal people to understand.

 Bau Moridol
 The lord of Chumunuri.

Races 
The fictional world of The Bird That Drinks Tears is inhabited by four major intelligent races - Human, nhaga, rekkon and tokebi. Other than the humankind, the races that appear in The Bird That Drinks Tears are in most respects Lee Yeongdo's original creations, even though the race of nhaga and tokebi originates from Indian and Korean legends, respectively.

 Human (Korean; 인간)
 A race of people who believe in 'God-at-Nowhere' and seek their king. They have the weakest power among the four races, but they have the advantage of being able to adapt anywhere and having the largest population. There are those who would love nothing more than to be crowned King and reestablish the once prosperous Arazi Kingdom.

 Nhaga (Korean; 나가)
 A race of people who believe in 'God-kills-Himself' and extract their hearts. They are a cold-blooded race with reptilian features. Highly vulnerable to the cold environments of the North, they reside in Kiboren, a tropical jungle south of the Boundary Line. Nhaga utilize a special form of silent communication called Neam (니름) and it is said that they can achieve a state of immortality through the ritualistic removal of their hearts.

 Tokebi (Korean; 도깨비)
 A race of people who believe in 'Goddess-without-Trails' and play their fire. Tokebi, inspired by a traditional Korean goblin, are mischievous and playful beings. They have a natural affinity for fire magic. And They are extremely afraid of blood, so they don't go to battle and live in the Citadel Chumunuri (즈믄누리) peacefully. It is said that mortal death is merely a pathway to a new life for the Tokebi and they live on as Orusin (어르신) in the afterlife. For this reason, they are often fearless and do not shy away from death as many mortal races do.

 Rekkon (Korean; 레콘)
 A race of people who believe in 'Goddess-lower-than-Every' and pursue their ambition. With traits reminiscent of giant, humanoid birds, they are warriors with overwhelming physical abilities. But they have weakness that they are afraid of water. They craft their weapons in The Final Forge and take on life-long challenges to fulfill their ambition for battle.

God 
Each race has an individual god, who have their own element that they command. They also gave their respective races a gift.

 God-at-Nowhere (Korean; 어디에도 없는 신)
 His element is wind; wind comes and goes, but is never at one place. His gift is Naneui (나늬), a human woman who is perceived as beautiful to all four races.

 Goddess-without-Trails (Korean; 발자국 없는 여신)
 Her element is water; water does not leave a trail in its path. Her gift is her name, which the Guardian (male nhaga priests) can use to directly communicate with the goddess.

 God-kills-Himself (Korean; 자신을 죽이는 신)
 His element is fire; fire uses up fuel in order to keep burning, eventually killing itself. His gift is the power to control fire.

 Goddess-lower-than-Every (Korean; 모든 이보다 낮은 여신)
 Her element is earth; the earth is beneath everyone. Her gift is Star-steel (별철), which cannot be broken and never rusts.

Animals 
 Dragon (Korean; 용 Yong)
 Unlike in other fantasy novels, dragons in this world are a plant-like species that propagate with spores. When the environment is favorable for the dragon to grow, leaves and flower sprout from the spore while its root develops into a Yonggeun (Dragon root). Then the root grows into a dragon. Like plants, the growth of a dragon reflects the environment that it is raised in; if it grows with horses, the dragon may become a flying horse. If it grows in the sea, the dragon can develop webbed feet. If necessary, a dragon can become nearly humanoid. It was hunted to extinction by the nhaga, because dragon can set fire to the forest.

 Black Lion (Korean; 흑사자 Heuksaja)
 They possess fur that emits heat. They were hunted to extinction by the nhaga, who wished to use their heat-emitting hide as a means to attack the north. They symbolize the king of Arazi.

 Sky Fish (Korean; 하늘치 Haneulchi)
  Huge flying fish. They have thousands of eyes and carry mysterious ruins on their backs. Beetles seem to fear Sky Fish for some unknown reason.

 Beetle (Korean; 딱정벌레 Ttakjeongbeolle)
 Instead of horses, Tokebi breed huge flying beetles as a means of transportation. Tokebi managed to teach beetles sign language, and beetles use their antennae to communicate with Tokebi. They are usually large enough to carry up to two people (one if the person happens to be a Rekkon).

 King Eagle (Korean; 왕독수리 Wangdoksuri)
 Giant eagles, bigger than alligators. Nhaga mind suppressors can fly through the sky by piloting King Eagles.

 Big Tiger (Korean; 대호 Daeho)
 They are larger than a normal tiger. In the novel, there are only two Daeho; Byeolbi (별비) in the legend and Marunare (마루나래) which is always with Amo Paye.

 Touksini (Korean; 두억시니 Dueoksini)
 They are called a race that has lost their gods from other races. All individuals exhibit irregular patterns, habits, and activities for which no average or standard can be found, and are unable to even speak properly, uttering meaningless words by jumbled words such as "bored roses in the nostrils."

Sequels 
Currently, Lee Yeongdo has written only one sequel to The Bird That Drinks Tears which is The Bird That Drinks Blood. 

It is expected that Lee Yeongdo will write two more sequels, because of the quote in the series that mentions four birds. In the book there is a riddle about four bird brothers. One bird drank water, one drank poison, one drank blood and one drank tears. The riddle asks who of the four birds will die first. This riddle appears repeatedly throughout both The Bird That Drinks Tears and The Bird That Drinks Blood, and is entwined with many of the themes that run through two series.

Because of this riddle, many people expect that Lee Yeongdo will write two more sequels to this Bird series, The Bird That Drinks Poison and The Bird That Drinks Water. However, Lee Yeongdo has not yet confirmed this rumour and whether he would actually continue to finish all four birds is still unknown.

Media franchise 
The audiobook was published on June 8, 2020.

The developers of Krafton are making a game based on this series.

References 

South Korean fantasy novels
Works by Lee Yeongdo
Novels first published in serial form
2003 novels